Llinars del Vallès is a village and a municipality in the comarca of Vallès Oriental, in the province of Barcelona and autonomous community of Catalonia, Spain. That village forms part of the county of Baix Montseny. Its municipal term goes by the mountain of the Massís del Montseny to the Serralada Litoral. The dry agriculture is more abundant than the wet, that only predomines in the Mogent river. The forests are mediterranean (pines and holm oaks), though in the Serralada Litoral there are also oaks and cork oaks.

References

External links 
Enciclopèdia Catalana, Llinars del Vallès
 Government data pages 

Municipalities in Vallès Oriental